V Coronae Borealis (V CrB) is a Mira-type long period variable star and carbon star in the constellation Corona Borealis. Its apparent magnitude varies between 6.9 and 12.6 over a period of 357 days

V Coronae Borealis is too far from Earth for its parallax to be measured effectively. Basing on a period of 357 days,   the absolute magnitude of V Coronae Borealis has been calculated to be -4.62. It was estimated to around 8810 light-years distant in a 2012 paper, shining with a luminosity approximately 102831 times that of the Sun and has a surface temperature of 2877 K.

References

Corona Borealis
Mira variables
Coronae Borealis, V
Carbon stars
Durchmusterung objects
141826
077501